Bernadette Lorraine Palisada Dominguez Sembrano-Aguinaldo (born February 18, 1976) is a Filipino reporter, News presenter, television host, and musician.

Career

Newscasting career
Sembrano started with IBC as a newscaster in 1997 before moving to the GMA Network in 1998, where she was the anchor of GMA Network News and the first wishing program of the country, Wish Ko Lang!. She and GMA had issues with a TV show she was hosting - exposing alleged graft and corruption of a government official - which the network delayed airing but with a certain disclaimer that caused her to walk-out on an evening news cast. From 1999 to 2004 she worked as the radio co-anchor in the noontime newscast Balita ng Bansa of DZAR Angel Radyo 1026 Manila by Nation Broadcasting Corporation (and later by Sonshine Media Network International in 2005). GMA terminated her contract on December 20, 2003, but she continued to work with Wish Ko Lang! until February 14, 2004. She was then wooed by the rival ABS-CBN in 2004 where she hosted the public service show "Lukso ng Dugo", an OFW Drama Anthology entitled Nagmamahal, Kapamilya and the morning show Magandang Umaga, Pilipinas. She also served as a correspondent for ABS-CBN's longest investigative journalism show, The Correspondents. She is the current host of Salamat Dok, a weekend current affairs program focusing on medicine and health issues.

Sembrano is a co-anchor on TV Patrol, a newscaster on the DZMM radio station programs like Radyo Patrol Balita Alas Dose, Gising Pilipinas with Nelson Lubao, and she anchored Radyo Patrol Balita Alas-Kwatro with Alex Santos when she replaced Jasmin Romero and  other news and public affairs programs of ABS-CBN. She is currently anchoring the morning program Lingkod Kapamilya with Winnie Cordero (previously Edric Calma and Julius Babao).

And now, Sembrano was back to Umagang Kay Ganda as main anchor/host with Anthony Taberna after a few months when she left the show together with Rica Peralejo, Ginger Conejero, and Bekimon. She replaced Pinky Webb, a former main anchor, and host of Umagang Kay Ganda who already left the morning show last August 2011.

On August 3, 2015, she was named permanent co-anchor of the weekday editions of the said flagship national evening newscast, succeeding Korina Sanchez who left due to Mar Roxas's impending presidential campaign, according to news website medianewser.com.

She remains one of the more visible newscasters, television hosts, and correspondents of the ABS-CBN News and Current Affairs.

Music career
On August 17, 2020, Sembrano was credited as co-lyricist alongside Star Music creative director Jonathan Manalo in the song "Ang Sa Iyo ay Akin" by Aegis, the theme song of the Philippine drama television series of the same name. In November 2020, she wrote and recorded the song "Yakapin ang Pasko," her very first song as singer.

On May 5, 2021, one year after the ABS-CBN shutdown, Sembrano released her second single "Yakap", which she composed and performed. It was revealed that she initially planned to release the single in 2020, but Manalo suggested that the single be released on the network's first anniversary of being off-air instead.

Personal life
In June 2008, she married Emilio "Orange" Aguinaldo IV, the great-grandson of the first President of the Philippines, Emilio Aguinaldo.

In July 2011, she announced that she has Bell's palsy and is undergoing therapy.

Education
Sembrano graduated elementary and high school from Angelicum School (now Angelicum College), a private Catholic school in Quezon City, Philippines. She earned a Bachelor of Science degree in business administration from the University of the Philippines, Diliman.

Discography

Singles
Yakapin ang Pasko - 2020 (under Star Music)
Yakap - 2021 (under Star Music)

Filmography

Television
Lingkod Kapamilya sa TeleRadyo (2017–present)
TV Patrol (2015–present)
TV Patrol Weekend (2005–2011)
Umagang Kay Ganda (2007–2015)
Salamat Dok (2010–2020)
Wish Ko Lang! (2002–2004)
Saksi (2003)
The Probe Team (1998–2003)
GMA Network News (1998–2002)

Radio
Lingkod Kapamilya sa DZMM (2017–2020)

Awards and citations
 Students' Choice of Female News and Public Affairs Host: 5th USTv Students Choice Awards
 Best TV Anchor, 9th Gawad Tanglaw Awards
 Most Admired Female TV Personality (from 2005 to 2010), Anak TV Seal Awards
 One of Best Morning Show Hosts for Umagang Kay Ganda (from 2008 to 2011), Star Awards for TV
 2012 Anak TV Makabata Star Awardee (Female TV Personalities)
 Best Public Service Program Host (Salamat Dok) - 2012 6th Gandingan Awards
 (Best Health Show Host), 3rd EdukCircle Awards 
 Best TV Public Service Host award for Salamat Dok, 21st Golden Dove Awards of the Kapisanan ng Broadkaster ng Pilipinas (KBP)
 Female Broadcast Journalist of the Year for TV - Rotary Club of Manila Journalism Awards 2014
 (Best Health Show Host), 4th EdukCircle Awards 2014
 Best TV Anchor (Dateline Philippines) - 13th Gawad Tanglaw 2015
 Best Female Morning Host (Umagang Kay Ganda) - 2016 Paragala Awards
 Best Female News Anchor - (TV Patrol) - Golden Laurel LPU Batangas Media Awards 2017

References

1976 births
Living people
Filipino television news anchors
Filipino radio journalists
University of the Philippines Diliman alumni
People from Quezon City
Bernadette
Intercontinental Broadcasting Corporation people
IBC News and Public Affairs people
GMA Network personalities
GMA Integrated News and Public Affairs people
ABS-CBN personalities
ABS-CBN News and Current Affairs people
Filipino singer-songwriters